Euthymius II may refer to:

Euthymius II of Constantinople (died 1416), Patriarch of Constantinople in 1410–16
Euthymius II of Novgorod (died 1458), Archbishop of Novgorod in 1429–58
Euthymius II Karmah (1572–1635), Melkite Patriarch of Antioch in 1634–35